The 2018–19 UTEP Miners basketball team represented the University of Texas at El Paso during the 2018–19 NCAA Division I men's basketball season. The Miners, led by first year head coach Rodney Terry, played their home games at the Don Haskins Center as members of Conference USA. UTEP finished the season 8–21, 3–15 in C-USA play to finish in last place. They failed to qualify for the C-USA Tournament.  UTEP averaged 4,677 fans per game.

Previous season
The Miners finished the 2017–18 season 11–20, 6–12 in C-USA play to finish in a tie for 11th place. They lost in the first round of the C-USA tournament to UTSA.

Following a loss to Lamar on November 27, 2017 that saw the Miners drop to 1–5 on the season, head coach Tim Floyd announced that he was retiring effective immediately. The school had previously announced a new athletic director, Jim Senter, a week prior, but Floyd said that had nothing to do with his decision. Assistant Phil Johnson was named interim head coach of the Miners the next day. Following the season, it was announced that Johnson would not return.

On March 12, 2018, the school hired Fresno State head coach Rodney Terry as the new head coach of the Miners.

Offseason

Departures

Incoming Transfers

Class of 2018 recruits

Class of 2019 recruits

Roster

Schedule and results

|-
!colspan=9 style=|Non-conference regular season

|-
!colspan=9 style=| Conference USA regular season

|-

Source

See also
2018–19 UTEP Miners women's basketball team

References

UTEP Miners men's basketball seasons
UTEP